Krass Clement Kay Christensen (born 15 March 1946) is a Danish photographer who has specialized in documentary work. He graduated as a film director in Copenhagen but soon turned to still photography, publishing his first book Skygger af øjeblikke (Shadows of the Moment) in 1978. He has since become an active documentary photographer, focusing on people from both Denmark and abroad. His earlier work is black and white but since 2000 he has also worked in colour.

Early life 
Born in 1946, Clement spent much of his childhood in Paris with his father, an artist, and his mother, a pianist. He began to photograph in the late 1950s. After a few freelance jobs in Paris from 1967 to 1970, he studied cinematography at the National Film School of Denmark in 1973. In 1978, he published Skygger af øjeblikke with themes from Denmark and abroad, establishing his name as a documentary still photographer.

Photographic work 
Det Tavse Land (1981) builds on Skygger af øjeblikke but only with photographs from Denmark. Its portrayal of the Danes and Denmark is very different from other contemporary works. With a critical yet sympathetic approach, he presents both the wrinkled faces of peasants and the dissatisfied looks of children, together with a series of open landscapes where the road or railway extends to the horizon. Despite the grey melancholic weather, the liveliness of the figures makes the book one of the brightest Clement has produced.

While much of Clement's work was first presented in exhibitions, by the 1990s he had turned to books as his preferred medium, often producing a new work every six months. Among his many voluminous publications of black and white photographs are Byen bag Regnen. Fotografier fra København (1987), Af en Bys Breve. Fotografier fra Lissabon (1993), Drum. Et sted i Irland (1996), Langs Vinden. Et fotografisk Essay (1998) and Før Natten. Havana (2001). These pictorial essays contain very little commentary, just a few words or place names accompany the photographs.

His documentary work emerges more vividly in books where he serves as an illustrator for others, as for example in Kirsten Jacobsen and Alex Frank Larsen's book Med Sød Forståelse (1982) about massage parlours in Copenhagen's Vesterbro district. But the documentary approach can also be seen in his own work. Et Danmarksbillede på Storebælt (1999) and Påskesøndag mellem 11 og 16 (2000) both present pictures of Danish life within a well-defined period of time or the so-called decisive moment. His moving Ved Døden (1990) where he follows his mother's last day of life through to her death and cremation is a good example.

His concern with death can also be seen in two biographical essays: Det lånte Lys (1995) and Langs Vinden (1998), one of which depicts a cancer-stricken friend living on borrowed time but nonetheless slowly approaching his end. The other is a kind of fable, describing a journey from the south of France and up through Germany to Denmark with flashbacks showing how houses along the route have disappeared and their inhabitants have disappeared. The images are all the more meaningful as they show old cars and clothing fashions we can all remember.

Clement's Novemberrejsen (2008) consists of moving black and white photographs of a small Danish village which has remained the same for years, unaffected by modern developments. But we also realize it all might have been very different, as in so many other places in Denmark. His recent book Paris: Carnet de Recherche (2010) presents images of the less glossy side of Paris in the 1960s and 1970s taken during the years he spent there with his father, the painter Kay Christensen. His black and white photographs depict scenes from everyday life, often with rather sad-looking figures, in surroundings showing roads, benches, a prostitute's room, the metro, sidestreets and bars.

Clement's work has developed with remarkable consistency. All his photographs demonstrate his engagement to his personal reporting style. He is one of the many documentary photographers who portrays the decisive moment but he does so in a particularly open and melancholic way. His exceptional ability to capture people in revealing situations is enhanced by his classically composed black and white photographs with their own suggestive appeal.

Publications 
 Skygger af øjeblikke. Copenhagen: Erichsen, 1978. .
 Det tavse land. Copenhagen: Borgen, 1981. .
 Gentagelsens fest: Fotografier fra det københavnske 6 dages løb. Copenhagen: Borgen, 1984. 
 Byen bag regnen: fotografier fra København. Copenhagen: Gyldendal, 1987. .
 Ved døden: Anne-Katharina 22. november 1901–23. januar 1989. Copenhagen: Gyldendal, 1990. .
 Hvor ingen talte: fotografier fra en park i Moskva. Copenhagen: Gyldendal, 1991. .
 Af en bys breve: fotografier fra Lissabon. Copenhagen: Gyldendal, 1993. .
 Det lånte lys: et fotografisk essay. Copenhagen: Gyldendal, 1995. .
 Drum: et sted i Irland. Copenhagen: Gyldendal, 1996. An "almost autobiographical account of the three journeys that Clement made into and out of Dublin while staying in Monaghan in March 1991." .
 Krass Clement – Drum. Books on Books 16. Errata, 2012. . With essays by Rune Gade and Jeffrey Ladd.
 Langs vinden: et fotografisk essay. Copenhagen: Gyldendal, 1998. .
 Færgen: et danmarksbillede på Storebælt. Copenhagen: Gyldendal, 1999. .
 Før natten. Copenhagen: Gyldendal, 2000. .
 Påskesøndag ml. 11 og 16. Copenhagen: Gyldendal, 2001. .
 Forandringen: Fotografier. Copenhagen: Gyldendal, 2002. .
 Berlin notat. Copenhagen: Gyldendal, 2005. .
 Lydhørt: Roskilde Festival 2003. Copenhagen: Gyldendal, 2005. .
 København – et blik over ryggen. Copenhagen: Fotografisk Center, 2006. .
 Novemberrejse. Copenhagen: Gyldendal, 2008. .
 Paris: Carnet de recherche. Copenhagen: Gyldendal, 2010. .
 Venten på i går Auf Gestern warten Copenhagen: Gyldendal, 2012. .
 Bag Saga Blok. Copenhagen: Gyldendal, 2014. .
 Impasse Hotel Syria. Copenhagen: Gyldendal, 2016. .
 Dublin. Bristol: RRB, 2017. Edition of 1000 copies. Coincides "with an exhibition of the work at the Gallery of Photography, Ireland.
 Across The Cut. Bristol: RRB, 2018. .
Metrovia. Copenhagen: Gyldendal, 2021. .
Belfast. Bristol: RRB, 2022.

Awards 
 1986: Grant from the Danish arts foundation, Statens Kunstfond
 1987: Grant from the Danish arts foundation, Statens Kunstfond
 1988: Grant from the Danish arts foundation, Statens Kunstfond
 1990: Three-year artist grant from the Danish arts foundation, Statens Kunstfond
 1997: Life-long artist grant from the Danish arts foundation, Statens Kunstfond
 1999: Thorvald Bindesbøll Medal
 2006: Fogtdal Photographers Award
 2006: Deutsche Börse Photography Prize, Nomination

Bibliography 
 Honickel, Thomas: “Es ist schade um die Menschen – der dänische Fotograf Krass Clement”, Photonews nr.4/07
 Jonge, Ingrid Fischer: “Det almindeliges nødvendighed”, Carlsbergfondets Årsberetning 1998 p. 160-165
 Jonge, Ingrid Fischer: “Det usynlige” in Fotografi I Diamanten – udvalgte værker fra Det Nationale Fotomuseum, Copenhagen 2004
 Kleivan, Birna Marianne: "Budbringeren/The Messenger, An interview with Krass Clement" in Katalog Journal of Photography and Video 21.3, Odense 2009
 Orvel, Miles: “Franks America. Clements Copenhagen” in Sølv og Salte edited by Tove Hansen, Copenhagen 1990.
 Parr, Martin, and Gerry Badger: “Krass Clement: Drum” in The Photobook – A History, volume II, London 2006
 Pedersen, Michael: “Som om…”, Institute for Northern Philology, University of Copenhagen 1993.
 Thrane, Finn: “Ud I verden og hjem igen. Krass Clement” in Dansk fotografihistorie edited by Mette Sandby, Copenhagen 2005
 Wamberg, Jacob, and Krass Clement: “Dansk Nutidskunst nr. 19 – Krass Clement”, Palle Fogtdal 1993.

References

External links 
 

Living people
1946 births
20th-century Danish photographers
21st-century Danish photographers
Danish photographers
Recipients of the Thorvald Bindesbøll Medal